The 2020 Pac-12 Conference men's basketball tournament was a postseason men's basketball tournament for the Pac-12 Conference, scheduled to be played March 11–14, 2020, at T-Mobile Arena on the Las Vegas Strip in Paradise, Nevada. It was canceled after the first round due to the COVID-19 pandemic. The winner of the tournament was to have received the conference's automatic bid to the 2020 NCAA tournament. 

The NCAA announced on March 11, 2020 that no fans would be able to attend the Men's and Women's 2020 NCAA tournaments, due to the COVID-19 pandemic. A number of conference basketball tournaments followed suit by either canceling entirely, or playing as scheduled, but with no spectators in attendance. However, tournaments that were held in Las Vegas, including the Pac-12, were conducted with spectators in attendance on Wednesday, March 11. By the evening of March 11, the Pac-12 announced that the remaining games would be played only with "essential staff, television network partners, credentialed media and limited family and friends."  

On March 12, the Pac-12 canceled the tournament before any more games were to be played. On the afternoon of March 12, 2020, the NCAA announced that all remaining winter and spring championships for both men's and women's sports were canceled due to the COVID-19 pandemic in the United States. Because of its late West Coast tip-off, the first round match-up between Colorado and Washington State would prove to be the last completed game of the 2019-20 men's basketball season.

Seeds
All 12 Pac-12 schools are eligible to participate in the tournament. Teams will be seeded by conference record, with a tiebreaker system used to seed teams with identical conference records. As a result, the top four teams receive a bye to the quarterfinals of the tournament. 

Tie-breaking procedures for determining all tournament seeding was:
For two-team tie
1. Results of head-to-head competition during the regular season.

2. Each team's record (won-lost percentage) vs. the team occupying the highest position in the final regular standings, and then continuing down through the standings until one team gains an advantage. 
When arriving at another group of tied teams while comparing records, use each team's record (won-lost percentage) against the collective tied teams as a group (prior to that group's own tie-breaking procedure), rather than the performance against individual tied teams.

3. Won-lost percentage against all Division I opponents.

4. Coin toss conducted by the Commissioner or designee.

For multiple-team tie
1. Results (won-lost percentage) of collective head-to-head competition during the regular season among the tied teams.

2. If more than two teams are still tied, each of the tied team's record (won-lost percentage) vs. the team occupying the highest position in the final regular season standings, and then continuing down through the standings, eliminating teams with inferior records, until one team gains an advantage.

When arriving at another group of tied teams while comparing records, use each team's record (won-lost percentage) against the collective tied teams as a group (prior to that group's own tie-breaking procedure), rather than the performance against individual tied teams.

After one team has an advantage and is seeded, all remaining teams in the multiple-team tie-breaker will repeat the multiple-team tie-breaking procedure.

If at any point the multiple-team tie is reduced to two teams, the two-team tie-breaking procedure will be applied.

3. Won-lost percentage against all Division I opponents.

4. Coin toss conducted by the Commissioner or designee.

Schedule

Bracket
* denotes overtime period

Game statistics

First round

Quarterfinals

Semifinals

Championship

Awards and honors

Hall of Honor
The following former players were inducted into the Pac-12 Hall of Honor, though a planned ceremony on Friday, March 13 prior to the tourney's semifinals did not occur due to its cancelation. They are: Sean Rooks (Arizona men's basketball), Melissa Belote Ripley (Arizona State women's swimming), Don Bowden (California men's track & field), Bill Marolt (Colorado men's skiing), Dan Fouts (Oregon football), Joni Huntley (Oregon State women's track & field), Jennifer Azzi (Stanford women's basketball), Jonathan Ogden (UCLA football), Barbara Hedges (USC athletic director), Kathy Kreiner-Phillips (Utah women's skiing), Lincoln Kennedy (Washington football), and Jeanne Eggart Helfer (Washington State women's basketball).

Team and tournament leaders

Tournament notes
The conference tournament was cancelled before completion, as were the 2020 NCAA Division I men's basketball tournament and 2020 National Invitation Tournament.

See also

2020 Pac-12 Conference women's basketball tournament

References

Tournament
Pac-12 Conference men's basketball tournament
Pac-12 Conference men's basketball tournament
College basketball tournaments in Nevada
Basketball competitions in the Las Vegas Valley
Pac-12 Conference men's basketball tournament
Pac-12 Conference men's basketball tournament
College sports tournaments in Nevada